Events from the year 1636 in Denmark.

Incumbents 
 Monarch – Christian IV

Events
 24 November  The first stones for the foundation are brought to the Rundetårn construction site on Købmagergade in Copenhagen, first from the city's ramparts and later from the area around Roskilde.

Undated

 The earliest documented Danish immigrants to the new world, Jan Jansen and his wife Engeltje, along with their children, arrive in the Dutch colony of New Amsterdam in 1636.

 Ole Worm succeeds Jesper Rasmussen Brochmand as Rector of the University of Copenhagen.

Births

Full date missing
 Otto Grote zu Schauen, statesman (died 1693)

Deaths

Publications
 Ole Worm: Runir seu Danica literatura antiquissima ("Runes: the oldest Danish literature")
Christen Sørensen Longomontanus: Disputatio de Matheseos Indole

References 

 
Denmark
Years of the 17th century in Denmark